Birkir Jón Jónsson (born 24 July 1979) is a member of parliament of the Althing, the Icelandic parliament. He is a member of the Progressive Party. He has been a member of the Icelandic Delegation to the Council of Europe Parliamentary Assembly since 2009.

External links
Althing biography

Living people
1979 births
Birkir Jon Jonsson
Birkir Jon Jonsson